TUR European Airways was a charter airline from Turkey that operated from 1988 until 1994.

History
TUR was set up in 1988 and began operations using two Boeing 727-200 for charter operations mostly from Germany flying German tourists and expatriate Turks to Turkey.

In the beginning things went pretty well due to a booming tourist market in Turkey, so much so that in 1991 a McDonnell Douglas MD-83 was added, followed by a second MD-83 a year later.  With the additional aircraft, the charter routes were expanded to include Belgium, Great Britain, France, the Netherlands and other northern European countries. Since no other MD-83 were available to for lease, more B727-200s were acquired.

In 1992 TUR entered the Turkish domestic market with flights from its base in Istanbul to Ankara, İzmir and other domestic destinations.  The economic problems due to the Gulf War brought a decline in the tourist market and two B727s were sold and flights reduced.  By 1993 the losses had mounted and as a result all scheduled flights were given up to concentrate on the charter business. But as losses continued, operations were suddenly halted in 1994 and the airline was liquidated.

Fleet
4 Boeing 727-230 (all ex-Condor aircraft)
1 Boeing 727-076
1 Boeing 737-2M8
2 McDonnell Douglas MD-83

References

External links

Fleet and code information

Defunct airlines of Turkey
Airlines established in 1988
Airlines disestablished in 1994
Defunct charter airlines of Turkey